Harwood may refer to:

Places 
Australia
 Harwood, New South Wales

Canada
 Harwood, Ontario
 Harwood Island (British Columbia)

New Zealand
 Harwood Hole
 Harwood, New Zealand

United Kingdom
 Harwood, County Durham
 Harwood, Greater Manchester
 Harwood Dale, North Yorkshire
 Great Harwood, Lancashire
 Little Harwood, Lancashire

United States
 Harwood, Indiana
 Harwood, Maryland
 Harwood, Missouri
 Harwood, North Dakota
 Harwood Center, Dallas
 Harwood Creek, California
 Harwood Heights, Illinois
 Harwood Township, Champaign County, Illinois
 Harwood, Texas
Harewood, West Virginia
 Mount Harwood in California

Other uses 
 Harwood (name)
 USS Harwood (DD-861), a US Navy destroyer
 Harwood's Gerbil
 The Harwood Butcher, fictional character in Grand Theft Auto
 Harwood Union High School, a high school in central Vermont, United States
 7040 Harwood, asteroid

See also
 Harewood (surname), typically pronounced 'Harwood', as a British surname